Abu Torab (also Romanized as Abū Torāb) is a village in Jannatabad Rural District, Salehabad County, Razavi Khorasan Province, Iran. At the 2006 census, its population was 56, in 13 families.

See also 

 List of cities, towns and villages in Razavi Khorasan Province

References 

Populated places in   Torbat-e Jam County